Nea Peramos is a town 17 kilometres from Kavala, the capital of the regional unit of Kavala, Greece. Its population at the 2011 census was 3,532.

Since 1998, according to the Law of Kapodistrias, seven villages (Nea Peramos, Nea Iraklitsa, Agios Andreas, Eleftheres, Elaiochori, Myrtofyto, Folea) joined in a new municipality which was called Municipality of Eleftheres. The central administration authority resided in Nea Peramos, which is the largest of the villages listed above. The first Mayor of the Community of Eleftheres was Iraklis Karaberidis. At the 2011 Kallikratis reform, the municipality of Eleftheres became part of the new municipality of Pangaio.

Nea Peramos is one hour from the island of Thasos, to the city of Kavala, and also to ancient Philippi, which is about 30 km distant.

References

Populated places in Kavala (regional unit)